Boca Raton Football Club is an American soccer club that currently plays in the National Premier Soccer League (NPSL). In 2015, which was their inaugural season, they were only defeated in one game and won the APSL championship and the APSL fall tournament. The club also competes in the PASL (Premier American Soccer League) and the Florida GCSL (Gold Coast Soccer League).

History 
In 2013, the club was given the rights to a National Premier Soccer League franchise for Palm Beach County, Florida. The initial plans for the team fell through at the last minute and the NPSL franchise was put on hiatus for two years.

APSL awarded Boca Raton a franchise and the club was officially announced on January 20, 2015. On May 2, 2015, 2,130 fans at Boca Raton High School saw South Florida FC defeated 4–1.

Boca Raton went on a 9-game win streak to take both the 2015 APSL regular season title and championship.

Boca Raton FC began NPSL Sunshine Conference play in May 2017.

After a year-long break in 2020 due to COVID-19, Boca Raton FC started competing again in the GCSL and the PASL in 2021, with participation confirmed for the NPSL season as well.

Players

Current roster

Notable players 
This list of current and former and present players includes those who received international caps while playing for the team, made significant contributions to the team in terms of appearances or goals while playing for the team, or who made significant contributions to the sport either before they played for the team, or after they left. It is clearly not yet complete and all inclusive, and additions and refinements will continue to be made over time.

  Scott Gordon (2015) (2016 US Open Cup)
 Nickardo Blake (2015–2017)
 Marcio Amoroso (2016)
 Luiz Carlos Nascimento Júnior (2016–2017)
 Leandro Netto de Macedo (2016–2017)

Current coaching staff

Former head coaches

Year-by-year

Results

Honors

APSL 
 2015 Regular Season Champion
 2015 Season Champion
 2015 Regular Fall Champion
 2015 Fall Champion
 2016 Season Champion
 2016 Fall Season Champion

United Premier Soccer League 
 2019 Spring Season South Florida Champion
 2019 Spring Season Florida Second Place

Team kit 
Boca Raton FC has its primary colors as Baby and Navy Blue. Their away uniform is all white.
 Home Colors: Baby and Navy Blue
 Away Colors: White

Team Mascot

References

Further reading
 Boca Raton FC Wins First Game in Franchise History
 Boca Raton FC Defeats South Florida FC 4–1 in Inaugural APSL Game
 Boca Raton FC Breaks Attendance Record
 FC Shakhtar Donetsk To Face Boca Raton FC on Monday, January 25
 Boyz defeat Boca Raton FC 2–0 in training match

External links 
 

 
Soccer clubs in Florida
Soccer clubs in South Florida
Sports Clubs Palm Beach County
Sport Clubs Boca Raton
National Premier Soccer League teams
Association football clubs established in 2015
2015 establishments in Florida
Sports in Boca Raton, Florida
Soccer clubs in Miami
American Premier Soccer League